Usher is the eponymous debut studio album by American singer Usher. It was released on August 30, 1994, by LaFace Records and Arista Records. As executive producer, Sean "Puffy" Combs mostly handled production work on the album, as additional production were provided by Chucky Thompson, DeVante Swing and Al B. Sure!, among others. Despite it underperforming on charts, debuting at number 167 on the US Billboard 200, the album did reach number 4 on the US Heatseekers Albums Chart. The release of the album was accompanied by the support of three singles: "Can U Get wit It", "Think of You" and "The Many Ways".

Critical reception

Billy Johnson Jr. of Yahoo! Music called the debut album "an enjoyable ride." Anderson Jones of Entertainment Weekly in a less-than-enthusiastic review of the album called the songs "sophomoric" and "remarkably dull."

Commercial performance
Usher debuted at number 167 on the US Billboard 200 chart. The album has sold over 200,000 copies in the United States to date.

Track listing

Notes
  denotes co-producer
Sample credits
 "I'll Make It Right" contains a sample from "Top Billin'" (1987) by Audio Two.
 "Slow Love" contains a sample from "The Show" (1985) by Doug E. Fresh.
 "I'll Show You Love" contains a sample from "Blind Man Can See It" (1973) by James Brown.
 "Final Goodbye" contains a sample from "Nobody Beats the Biz" (1988) by Biz Markie.

Personnel
Information taken from Allmusic.

Assistant engineering – Daniel Beroff
Drums – Alexander Richbourg
Engineering – Al B. Sure!, Charles "Prince Charles" Alexander, Bob Brockman, Larry Funk, Gerhard Joost, Tony Maserati, Brian Alexander Morgan, Nasheim Myrick, Rob Paustian
Executive production – Sean "Puffy" Combs, L.A. Reid
Guitar – Darryl Pearson
Keyboards – Herb Middleton
Mixing – Charles "Prince Charles" Alexander, Bob Brockman, Sean "Puffy" Combs, David Dachinger, DeVante Swing, Rob Paustian, John Shrive

Multi-instruments – DeVante Swing, Brian Alexander Morgan, Tim Mosley, Darryl Pearson
Photography – Michael Benabib
Production – Al B. Sure!, Sean "Puffy" Combs, Ward Corbett, DeVante Swing, Edward "Eddie F" Ferrell, Kiyamma Griffin, Dave Hall, Isaiah Lee, Brian Alexander Morgan, Darryl Pearson, Alexander Richbourg
Songwriting – Ward Corbett
Vocals – Usher
Background vocals – Darren Benbow, Mary Brown, Faith Evans, Dave Hollister, Crystal Johnson, Darryl Pearson, Laquentis Saxon, Usher, Levar "Lil' Tone" Wilson

Charts

Weekly charts

Year-end charts

References

External links
 
 Usher at Discogs

1994 debut albums
Usher (musician) albums
Albums produced by Sean Combs
LaFace Records albums
Hip hop soul albums
New jack swing albums